A sno-ball is a Louisiana confection made with finely shaved ice and flavored  sugar syrup. Commonly confused with the snow cone, the ice of a sno-ball is fine and fluffy; while a snow cone's ice is coarse, crunchy, and granular. Moreover, whereas in a snow cone the flavored syrup sinks to the bottom of the cup, in a sno-ball the ice absorbs the syrup. 

Sno-balls are a seasonal treat as they are generally sold only from roughly March to October. They are vended from "sno-ball stands" throughout parts of Louisiana, Mississippi.

History 
Before the 1930s ice was manually scraped from a block of ice, producing a coarser, crunchier version of the sno-ball. In 1933, Ernest Hansen began work on an ice-shaving machine; and by 1934, he had invented the first motor-driven ice-shaving machine. For two years, Hansen kept the machine within his family, making sno-balls for only his children and relatives. In 1936, Ernest and his wife Mary took their machine to the streets of New Orleans and opened Hansen's Sno-Bliz. The business ran discontinuously for the following two years because Mary needed to care for her children. In 1939, they opened the shop and remained in business for the next 67 years.

By this time, grocer George Ortolano had invented his own ice-shaving machine, which he later called the Sno-Wizard. Ortolano redeveloped his wooden machine into one made of galvanized metal after he began receiving requests from people who wanted to use his machine to start their own businesses. Soon thereafter, he drew up blueprints for his machine and set his product into automated production. Ortolano's Sno-Wizards are now the primary sno-ball machines used in Louisiana and throughout the Gulf Coast.

Flavors 
The following list contains many of the sno-ball flavors available at sno-ball stands around New Orleans.

 Almond
 Banana
 Bahama Mama
 Blackberry
 Blue Bubble Gum
 Blueberry
 Blue Raspberry
 Buttered popcorn 
 Cake batter 
 Cherry
 Chocolate 
 Coconut
 Coffee
 Cotton Candy
 Cream soda
 Dreamsicle
 Daiquiri
 French vanilla
 Grape
 Green apple
 Hawaiian Punch
 Ice cream
 Joker
 Key lime pie 
 King cake
 Kiwi
 Lemon 
 Lemon-ice
 Lemon-lime
 Lime
 Margarita
 Nectar
 Orange
 Orchid vanilla
 Peach
 Peanut butter 
 Piña colada
 Pineapple
 Pink lemonade
 Raspberry
 Rocket 88
 Root beer
 Silver fox
 Spearmint
 Strawberry 
 Tamarind 
 Tangerine
 Tiger's blood
 Tutti frutti
 Vanilla malt 
 Watermelon
 Wedding cake

Variations 
 Cheesecake Stuffed Snowball: created by Sno-La Snowballs, the snowball is stuffed with cheesecake in the center, surrounded by the snowball flavor of choice.
Stuffed sno-ball: a sno-ball stuffed with vanilla or chocolate softserve ice cream
 Cream-flavored sno-ball: a sno-ball made with flavored syrup mixed with evaporated milk
 Sugar-free sno-ball: a sno-ball made with sugar-free syrup
 Toppings: soft-serve ice cream, condensed milk, marshmallow fluff, Oreos

References

Further reading

External links

Cuisine of New Orleans
Ice-based desserts